Bhirawati is a village in Ferozepur Jhirka sub-division of Nuh District of Haryana state of India. It lies in the Mewat region of Delhi NCR and Delhi–Mumbai Industrial Corridor. It lies 10 km east of Sohna adjacent to the NH 919 and Delhi Mumbai Expressway.

Demography 
It had a population of 1,424 as per 2011 Census of India.

Administration
The village local governance is managed by the elected panchayat headed by the Sarpanch.

See also 
 Bhiwadi
 Bhadas
 Gurgaon
 Moolthan

References 

Villages in Nuh district